Tad Low (born Josiah Orne Low IV  on September 26, 1966) is an American businessman and media entrepreneur. He is the creator and producer of television shows, including Pop-Up Video and Pants-Off Dance-Off. He currently helms Spin The Bottle, a multimedia content company based in New York City. Low's work has been noted in the press for its ironic sensibility, and his shows simultaneously critique and celebrate popular culture in all of its banal and sublime incarnations. The paradoxical nature of Low's aesthetic was articulated by New York magazine when it dubbed Pants-Off Dance-Off both "brilliant and lowbrow".

Personal history

A son of Penelope Ireland Low and Josiah Orne Low III, he was born and raised in Connecticut, a direct descendant of the Lows, once one of America's wealthiest families.

One of his antecedents, Seth Low, served as both the Mayor of New York and as president of Columbia University. Low is a graduate of Yale, where he was a member of The Society of Orpheus and Bacchus. He made his first television appearance with a rubber chicken on Marlo and the Magic Movie Machine in the sixth grade.  In 1994, Low hosted the syndicated television show Last Call, produced by Brandon Tartikoff and MCA.  Low has subsequently hosted and appeared on various television shows for MTV, VH1, CBS, NBC, and Fox. He has also contributed articles to Men's Health and The New York Times.

Since 1996, Pop-Up Video has been nominated for 13 Emmys, and in 2000 Low won a New York Emmy as host and producer of Subway Q&A, a show he co-created for Cablevision's Metro Channel.

Low lives in New York City with his wife, Alisa Lea Ruvinsky, a managing director at JP Morgan Chase, and their children. The couple exchanged vows at the Manhattan Marriage Bureau on June 6, 2013. 

His creative work and memorabilia are housed in the Rock & Roll Hall of Fame Library and Archives.

Shows

Pop-Up Video first aired on VH1 in October 1996.  It inserted bubbles containing trivia and snarky behind-the-scenes commentary into existing music videos.  The show spawned numerous imitators and earned ten Emmy nominations.  Low's inspiration for the show came from hearing a stylist friend's tales of mistreatment at the hands of a famous female pop star.  As Low claims in an interview for a Canadian newspaper, "I'd be watching (this singer) being wonderful and fabulous in all these cheesy videos, while at the same time I was hearing one horrible story after another of the acts of human degradation committed by this woman." Low's fascination with this incongruity eventually culminated in the creation of "Pop-Up Video".

Video IQ debuted on the Fuse network in November 2004.  One of the first interactive game shows, Video IQ gave viewers the chance to win prizes by deciphering and text-messaging the answers to rebus-style puzzles embedded in the images and lyrics of music videos.  Video IQ was similar in temperament to the wry and biting Pop-Up Video.  In one show, for example, the clue "Semi-retired blond pop tart" yielded the answer Britney Spears.

Subway Q&A.  Low hosted and co-created this show on the Metro Channel along with Ronald Fried. Debuting in 2000, this show featured Low, along with a camera crew, coaxing subway commuters into disrupting their daily routines by, for example, holding an impromptu trial in a subway car in which riders were asked to be the jury, persuading subway passengers to try on a stranger's hat, and convincing a woman he had never met before to join him for a catered dinner on the subway platform in the middle of rush hour.  Cajoling ordinary New York City subway commuters into exploring their inner performers, Subway Q&A reflected Low's desire, in the words of a New York Times reporter, to "elevate real people to celebrity". Low was awarded a New York Emmy as host and producer of Subway Q&A in 2000 and appeared on the cover of The New York Times Television Magazine.

Pants-Off Dance-Off. Low is the creator and executive producer of PODO, which debuted on the Fuse network on April 18, 2006.  The highest-rated show in the Fuse network's history, PODO combines elements of a dance contest with a striptease.  Each episode features five amateur contestants (aka "pancers") who disrobe while dancing in front of a screen playing their favorite music videos. The show also contains an interactive element, as home viewers have the opportunity to vote for contestants in categories such as "funniest", "most disturbing" and "best dancer" on the show's website. According to The New York Times television critic David Itzkoff, PODO not only helped garner media attention and public exposure for the Fuse network (no pun intended), but also promoted an ethos similar to the all-encompassing philosophy of Subway Q&A: "In contrast to the unattainable standards of perfections promoted by celebrity television, 'Pants-Off Dance-Off' is meant to be an inclusive experience, one that has already welcomed competitors as diverse as a 58-year-old retired schoolteacher and a woman in a unicorn mask."

Low's most recent television series include Pet-O-Rama (a skills competition for household pets), Best Places Ever I've Ever Been (a tour of travel experts' favorite unknown destinations), TXT MSG (a "Pop-Up Video"-style treatment of archival sports footage) and Photo ID (a look into the unusual lives of everyday people, through photos and anecdotes).  The shows premiered in 2010 on Animal Planet, The Travel Channel, MSG Network & Verizon's FiOS, respectively.

Controversy 

Low disrupted the live telecast of the TV Guide Awards on Fox on March 5, 2000 by crashing the stage and yelling "This is robbery!" after his Pop-Up Video lost to Carson Daly and MTV's Total Request Live in the Favorite Music Show category. "What is this 'Total Request Live?!,'" he shouted.  "It just asks softball questions to celebrities!"  He was tackled on stage and escorted off the studio lot by five men who threatened to break his arm.

Filmography

Television

Bibliography

References

External links
  Spin The Bottle
  Tad Low

1966 births
Living people
Television producers from Connecticut
Emmy Award winners
Yale University alumni